Old High Middle School is a public middle school in Bentonville, Arkansas part of the Bentonville Public Schools. Its building was once home to Bentonville High School. It was designed by John Parks Almand. It combines Spanish Colonial, Mission and Mediterranean styles. Construction costs during building in 1928 were $25,000.

It was listed on the National Register of Historic Places in 1989 as Bentonville High School.

History
The main structure was built in 1928. After years of serving as an elementary and high school campus, Old High Middle School was established in 1990 . 1990-1991 also brought about renovations to the auditorium as well. The Bentonville/Bella Vista Rotary Club worked with the community to renovate the original structure with one third of the money raised coming from a concert by New Kids on the Block. In May 2015, Old High Middle School's auditorium was chosen as one of the venues for the Bentonville Film Festival. After many preparations to the school, including refinishing the stage, touch-up painting, and updating the dressing rooms backstage, it was concluded that the popularity of the film festival demanded a larger venue. In May 2016, Old High hosted the successful Bentonville Film Festival, which included actress Geena Davis.

Academics
Old High Middle School teaches more than 600 students in grades five and six. The school's top three priorities are relationships, literacy, and calculated risk taking. Old High is organized by Teams into which students are placed. Leslie Lyons is currently the school’s Principal. Jason Brunner is the Assistant Principal and was selected as the Arkansas Assistant Principal of the Year for 2013-2014 by the Arkansas Association of Middle Level Education.

Communities zoned to Old High Middle include: sections of northwest Bentonville, much of Bella Vista, and a small section of Gravette.

See also
Bentonville High School, the current high school.
National Register of Historic Places listings in Benton County, Arkansas

References

External links

Old High Middle School

School buildings on the National Register of Historic Places in Arkansas
School buildings completed in 1928
Schools in Benton County, Arkansas
Mission Revival architecture in Arkansas
Spanish Revival architecture in Arkansas
National Register of Historic Places in Bentonville, Arkansas
1928 establishments in Arkansas
Middle schools in Arkansas